The El Prat Museum, in El Prat de Llobregat (Baix Llobregat), was created in 1962 as part of an initiative of the town council to recover the town’s historic and natural heritage. It is located in Balcells Tower, a building from the mid-19th century that was used for farming and as a summer residence, and is part of the Barcelona Provincial Council Local Museum Network. In the next few years the El Prat Museum will relocate to a new building currently under construction.

Exhibition
The museum collection is divided into three large blocks: a vast collection of material related to El Prat’s agricultural and industrial past; an ornithological collection, representing the rich fauna of the Llobregat Delta; and a contemporary art collection that currently includes 300 works of art. The central theme of the permanent exhibition, remodelled in 1996, is the process behind the formation and transformation of the Llobregat Delta.

References

External links
 
 Local Museum Network site

El Prat de Llobregat
Barcelona Provincial Council Local Museum Network
Buildings and structures in Baix Llobregat
History museums in Catalonia
Art museums and galleries in Catalonia
Local museums in Spain